Dolinnoe is a commune in Criuleni District, Moldova. It is composed of three villages: Dolinnoe, Valea Coloniței and Valea Satului.

References

Communes of Criuleni District